The 1989 Lehigh Engineers football team was an American football team that represented Lehigh University during the 1989 NCAA Division I-AA football season. Lehigh tied for last in the Colonial League.

In their fourth year under head coach Hank Small, the Engineers compiled a 5–6 record. Vance Cassell and John Masonis were the team captains.

Despite posting a losing record, the Engineers outscored opponents 371 to 360. Lehigh's 1–3 conference record tied for fourth in the five-team Colonial League standings.

Lehigh played its home games at Goodman Stadium on the university's Goodman Campus in Bethlehem, Pennsylvania.

Schedule

References

Lehigh
Lehigh Mountain Hawks football seasons
Lehigh Engineers football